In graph theory, the bipartite double cover of an undirected graph  is a bipartite, covering graph of , with twice as many vertices as . It can be constructed as the tensor product of graphs, .

It should not be confused with a cycle double cover of a graph, a family of cycles that includes each edge twice.

Construction
For instance, below is an illustration of a bipartite double cover of a non-bipartite graph . In the illustration, each vertex in the tensor product is shown using a color from the first term of the product and a shape from the second term of the product; therefore, the vertices  in the double cover are shown as circles while the vertices  are shown as squares.

Examples
The bipartite double cover of the Petersen graph is the Desargues graph: .

The bipartite double cover of a complete graph  is a crown graph (a complete bipartite graph  minus a perfect matching). In particular, the bipartite double cover of the graph of a tetrahedron, is the graph of a cube.

The bipartite double cover of an odd-length cycle graph is a cycle of twice the length, while the bipartite double of any bipartite graph (such as an even length cycle, shown in the following example) is formed by two disjoint copies of the original graph.

Matrix interpretation

That is, the conversion from a graph to its double cover can be performed simply by reinterpreting  as a biadjacency matrix instead of as an adjacency matrix. More generally, the reinterpretation the adjacency matrices of directed graphs as biadjacency matrices provides a combinatorial equivalence between directed graphs and balanced bipartite graphs.

Properties
A bipartite double cover is connected if and only if  is connected and non-bipartite.

The bipartite double cover is a special case of a double cover (a 2-fold covering graph). A double cover in graph theory can be viewed as a special case of a topological double cover.

It is possible for two different graphs to have isomorphic bipartite double covers. For instance, the Desargues graph is not only the bipartite double cover of the Petersen graph, but is also the bipartite double cover of a different graph that is not isomorphic to the Petersen graph. Not every bipartite graph is a bipartite double cover of another graph; for a bipartite graph  to be the bipartite cover of another graph, it is necessary and sufficient that the automorphisms of  include an involution that maps each vertex to a distinct and non-adjacent vertex. For instance, the graph with two vertices and one edge is bipartite but is not a bipartite double cover, because it has no non-adjacent pairs of vertices to be mapped to each other by such an involution; on the other hand, the graph of the cube is a bipartite double cover, and has an involution that maps each vertex to the diametrally opposite vertex.

Name
In a connected graph that is not bipartite, only one double cover is bipartite, but when the graph is bipartite or disconnected there may be more than one. For this reason, Tomaž Pisanski has argued that the name "bipartite double cover" should be deprecated in favor of the "canonical double cover" or "Kronecker cover", names which are unambiguous.

Other double covers
In general, a graph may have multiple double covers that are different from the bipartite double cover. 
In the figure, the surjection is indicated by the colours. In particular, the degree of each blue node is the same. The same applies to each colour.
 The graph  is a double cover (or 2-fold cover or 2-lift) of  if the preimage of each node in  has size 2.

In the following figure, the graph  is a double cover of the graph :

If we replace one triangle by a square in  the resulting graph has four distinct double 
covers. Two of them are bipartite but only one of them is the Kronecker cover.

The double covers of a graph correspond to the different ways to sign the edges of the graph.

See also
Bipartite half

Notes

References
.
. The “coverings” in the title of this paper refer to the vertex cover problem, not to bipartite double covers. However,  cite this paper as the source of the idea of reinterpreting the adjacency matrix as a biadjacency matrix.
.
.

.
.

External links

Graph operations
Bipartite graphs